Graphium taboranus is a butterfly in the family Papilionidae. It is found in Angola, the Democratic Republic of Congo, Tanzania, Malawi, and northern Zambia. The habitat consists of woodland.

Description
Diagnostic.The markings of the upper surface snow-white; the discal band in cellule 2 of the forewing is smaller, not reaching the base of the cellule and is quite free; the white subdiscal spots of the hindwing above are almost in the middle of the marginal band. Nyassaland and German East Africa.

Biology
The larvae feed on Annona species.

Taxonomy
Graphium taboranus belongs to a clade with six members. All have similar genitalia
The clade members are:
Graphium angolanus (Goeze, 1779)
Graphium endochus (Boisduval, 1836)
Graphium morania (Angas, 1849)
Graphium taboranus (Oberthür, 1886)
Graphium schaffgotschi (Niepelt, 1927)
Graphium ridleyanus (White, 1843)

References

Carcasson, R.H 1960 The Swallowtail Butterflies of East Africa (Lepidoptera,Papilionidae). Journal of the  East Africa Natural History Society pdf Key to East Africa members of the species group, diagnostic and other notes and figures. (Permission to host granted by The East Africa Natural History Society).

Tabor
Butterflies of Africa
Butterflies described in 1886
Taxa named by Charles Oberthür